This is a comprehensive listing of official releases by Faith Evans, an American R&B, hip hop and soul singer. As of January 2023, she has released seven studio albums, one holiday album, and thirty singles on Bad Boy Entertainment and Capitol Records.

Newly contracted to Bad Boy Records in 1995, Evans was consulted by executive producer Sean Combs to contribute backing vocals and writing skills to Mary J. Blige's My Life (1994) and Usher's self-titled debut album (1994) prior to starting work on her debut record album Faith. Released on August 29, 1995, in North America, the album was a collaboration with Bad Boy's main producers The Hitmen, including Chucky Thompson and Combs, but it also resulted in recordings with Poke & Tone and Herb Middleton. Faith became a success based on the singles "You Used to Love Me" and "Soon as I Get Home". The album was certified platinum with 1.5 million copies sold, according to RIAA. After The Notorious B.I.G.'s murder during March 1997, Combs helped Evans produce her tribute song named "I'll Be Missing You", based on the melody of The Police's 1983 single "Every Breath You Take". The song, which featured Combs, Evans, and all-male group 112, became a worldwide number-one success and debuted on top of the Billboard Hot 100 during 1997, scoring that for eleven weeks. The next year, Evans was featured on "Heartbreak Hotel", a collaboration with singers Whitney Houston and Kelly Price, that scored number two on the Billboard Hot 100 chart.

Two years in the making, Evans' second solo effort, Keep the Faith, was released during October 1998. Almost entirely written and produced by her, Evans considered the album difficult to complete as she had initially felt discouraged about the progress at first. Upon its release, however, the album garnered generally positive reviews by music critics, with Allmusic noting it "without a doubt a highlight of 1990s soul-pop music". Also enjoying commercial success, it eventually went platinum and produced the top ten singles "Love Like This" and "All Night Long" prompting Evans to start an 18-city theater tour with Dru Hill and Total the following year.

Evans' third album on the Bad Boy imprint, named Faithfully (2001), involved her working with a wider range of producers, including The Neptunes, Mario Winans, Buckwild, Vada Nobles, Cory Rooney, and others. Her first project with husband Todd Russaw as executive producer and creative partner, the album scored number 14 on the Billboard 200 album chart and number two on the Top R&B/Hip-Hop Albums chart, eventually being certified platinum, but yielded moderately successful singles, with the Jennifer Lopez-written "I Love You" becoming the only top twenty entry. Released amid Bad Boy Records' transition from distributor Arista Records to Universal, Evans felt Faithfully received minimum assistance by the company, and during 2004, she finally decided to end her business with Bad Boy as she was convinced Combs couldn't improve her career any more due to his other commitments.

After ending with Bad Boy Evans contracted with Capitol Records company, becoming the first contemporary R&B artist to do so, and started work on her fourth studio album The First Lady, named after her nickname on her former label. As opposed to having an in-house team of producers who supplied most of the previous material, she and Russaw were able to gain more creative control of the album and consulted producers such as Bryan-Michael Cox, Jermaine Dupri, Mike Caren, Pharrell Williams, and Chucky Thompson to contribute to it. Upon its release in April 2005, The First Lady scored at number two on the Billboard 200 and #1 of the Top R&B/Hip-Hop Albums chart, becoming Evans' best-charting album to date. It was eventually certified gold by the RIAA.
At the end of the year, Evans released A Faithful Christmas, a holiday album of traditional Christmas songs and original tracks. The effort would become her last release on Capitol Records as the company was bought during 2007.

Following a longer hiatus, Evans signed a deal with E1 Entertainment in 2010. Her fifth studio album Something About Faith was released on October 5, 2010, in the United States. In the US, the album debuted and peaked at number fifteen on the Billboard 200, number four on the Top R&B/Hip-Hop Albums chart and number one on the Independent Albums chart, failing however to chart outside the US - making it Evans' only album since her debut Faith to chart in the US only. Something About Faith has spawned the single and music video "Gone Already"; which spent over thirty-three weeks on the US Billboard Hot R&B/Hip-Hop Songs chart, where it peaked at number twenty-two.

A prominent feature, Evans has contributed guest vocals to more than sixty collaborations on other artists' albums. Her 1997 tribute single featuring Puff Daddy and 112, entitled "I'll Be Missing You," became her biggest-selling hit to date and won her a Grammy Award in 1998.

Albums

Studio albums

Holiday albums

Compilation albums

Singles

As lead artist

As featured artist

Promotional singles

Other charted songs

Guest appearances

Soundtracks

See also
 List of number-one hits (United States)
 List of artists who reached number one on the Hot 100 (U.S.)
 List of number-one rhythm and blues hits (United States)
 List of number-one dance hits (United States)
 List of artists who reached number one on the U.S. Dance chart

Notes

 A  Promotional release only.

Charts

References
General

 "Performer: Faith Evans". aCharts.us. Retrieved on 2009-03-28.
 "Main Page". EveryHit. Retrieved on 2008-12-28.
 "Main Page". IrishCharts. Retrieved on 2008-12-28.
 "Main Page" (in German). Offizielle Charts. Retrieved on 8 August 2019.
 "International Charts Database" (in German). Swisscharts. Retrieved on 2008-12-28.
 [ "Faith Evans > Charts & Awards > Billboard Albums"]. Allmusic. Retrieved on 2008-12-28.
 [ "Faith Evans > Charts & Awards > Billboard Singles"]. Allmusic. Retrieved on 2008-12-28.

Specific

External links 
 Faith Evans at MySpace
 
 

Discographies of American artists
Rhythm and blues discographies
Discography
Soul music discographies